IGEL Technology is a German multinational software company best known for their "Next generation edge operating system" which is purpose-built for secure access to cloud workspaces such as Virtual Desktop Infrastructure (VDI) and/or Desktop as a Service. 

In February 2021, it was announced that TA Associates ("TA") signed a definitive agreement to make a majority investment in IGEL. TA joins existing IGEL investor C. Melchers GmbH & Co. KG ("Melchers"), which has been IGEL's primary investor since its founding in 2001. Melchers will maintain a significant equity interest in the company. 

Traditionally and historically known as a manufacturer of hardware "thin clients", IGEL is now primarily a software company which allow organizations to deploy and manage IGEL's Linux based operating system as an alternative to Windows on the endpoint. Organizations can deploy IGEL OS to allow access to cloud workspaces. With support for Citrix, VMware, Microsoft, Amazon and many other desktop virtualization technologies, IGEL can help organizations convert existing endpoints to IGEL OS and support any cloud, any protocol. By converting existing compatible x86 devices, organizations can extend the life of existing hardware, reduce their carbon footprint, save capital expenditure, improve endpoint security and reduce operational costs.

For its software, IGEL holds strategic alliance partnerships with over 100 technology companies including Citrix, Microsoft, VMware, and Amazon as well as healthcare-sector OEMs including Imprivata and Caradigm. Most recently, Microsoft and IGEL have jointly announced support for Windows Virtual Desktop (WVD), naming IGEL as the 1st Linux based client for this newest Microsoft Desktop as a Service offering. 

For its hardware, IGEL holds strategic alliance partnerships with AMD, Intel, LG, NVidia, and Samsung as well as many 3rd party hardware manufacturers such as Sennheiser, and other industry-specific input devices. 

As a result of its continued success, IGEL's global revenues grew 35% in 2019 and exceeded $150M. IGEL employed over 100 new staff across the business growing to close to 400 worldwide employees and continues to invest in its Augsburg based development team which released IGEL OS 11 in 2019. 

IGEL products are used by 17,000 customers worldwide and in 2019 IGEL sold close to 750,000 seats, over 500,000 of which were software.

IGEL sells its products exclusively through channel partners with a three-tier channel program. IGEL today has more than 1,000 trading partners but focuses its attention on working with their Platinum and Gold partners and allowing distribution to manage and maintain their Authorized IGEL Partners (AIP).   

In recent years, IGEL has hosted a cloud workspaces and end user computing event called DISRUPT. DISRUPT celebrated its 3rd year in January 2020, hosting two forums, 1 in Nashville and the other in Munich, Germany. Each location brought together over 500 attendees from the cloud workspaces and end-user computing spaces and was sponsored by Microsoft, Citrix, VMware, Amazon and more than 30+ other vendors who operate in the space. The event is attended by  partners, community members and customers who are involved in cloud workspaces and end-user computing, and/or helping organizations deploy the modern workspace.  

Its headquarters are in Bremen, Germany with North American operations out of San Francisco.

References

Companies based in Bremen
Manufacturing companies based in Bremen (state)
Thin clients